Ole Jørn Myklebust (born 30 April 1977 in Eidsdal, Norway) is a Norwegian Jazz musician (trumpet, flugelhorn and vocals), educated at the Norges Musikkhøgskole. Known for performing in Subtonic, Køhn/Johansen Sextet, Geir Lysne Listening Ensemble, Østenfor Sol and Dixi, Myklebust has collaborated with Mari Boine and Unni Wilhelmsen.

Career 
Myklebust was voted "The Best Young Jazz Musicians in Norway" in 2000. He has also played with the band Østenfor Sol, in addition to Mari Boine's and Unni Wilhelmsen's bands. Myklebust also works as composer, musical arranger and producer. He has composed music for TV, film, and documentaries. He came in as a substitute on the trumpet with Mike del Ferro Quintet, with among others Anne Paceo (drums), on their Norway tour in January 2012.

Discography 
From Groove.no & Discogs.com

As band leader 
With "Østenfor Sol"
1998: Syng, Dovre (MajorStudio)
2001: Troillspel (MajorStudio)

With "Subtonic"
2004: In This House (Aim Records)
2006: Oslo Jazzfestival 20 År (Oslo Jazzfestival), various artists live – on the track "Subtonic»

As sideman 
With Geir Lysne
2002: Aurora Borealis – Nordic Lights (ACT Records), Suite For Jazz Orchestra
2003: Korall (ACT Records), "Geir Lysne Listening Ensemble" feat. Sondre Bratland
2006: Boahjenásti – The North Star (ACT Records), "Geir Lysne Listening Ensemble"

With "Notodden Blues Band" & Torhild Sivertsen
2003: Soul (Bluestown Records)

With Køhn/Johansen
2003: Angels (Real Records), on the track "Mercurial Love»

With Bugge Wesseltoft
2004: New Conception of Jazz: Film Ing (Jazzland Records), on the tracks "Hi Is?" & "Oh Ye»

With Samsaya
2004: Shedding Skin (Port Azur/Tuba)

With Jaa9 & Onkl P
2004: Sjåre Brymæ (C+C Records, Sonet Music)

With Dum Dum Boys
2006: Gravitasjon (Oh Yeah!/EMI Virgin), on the track "Lunta Brenner»
2009: Tidsmaskin (Oh Yeah!/EMI Virgin)

With Unni Wilhelmsen
2006: Til Meg (St. Cecilia Music)

With Torun Eriksen
2006: Your Guide to the North Sea Jazz Festival 2006, various artists – on the track "This Is So Real"

With "El Axel"
2007: It Is Wha It Is (Pass It Records), on the track "Showtime (Move Your Arms)»

With Paal Flaata
2008: Old Angel Midnight (Pass It Records), on the track "Ten Pretty Houses in a Row»

With Brynjar Rasmussen
2011: Arctic Mood (Nordnorsk Jazzsenter, Finito Bacalao Records)

As arranger for Jim Stärk 
2002: Ten Songs and Hey Hey – (BP/Sonet)

References

External links 

Artistside på Groove.no

Norwegian trumpeters
People from Eidsdal
20th-century Norwegian trumpeters
21st-century Norwegian trumpeters
Norwegian jazz trumpeters
Male trumpeters
Norwegian jazz composers
Norwegian Academy of Music alumni
1977 births
Living people
Musicians from Møre og Romsdal
Male jazz composers
20th-century Norwegian male musicians
21st-century Norwegian male musicians